The National Administrative Department of Solidarity Economy (DanSocial) was a Colombian Executive Administrative Department in charge of directing and coordinating government policy to promote, plan, protect, strengthen, and develop the organizations of social economy in order to improve the quality of life of the Colombian people.

References

1998 establishments in Colombia
Government agencies established in 1998
Government agencies disestablished in 2011
Administrative departments of Colombia